James Frederic Margraff III (April 18, 1960 – January 2, 2019) was an American football coach. He served as the head football coach at Johns Hopkins University from 1990 to 2018, compiling a record of 221–89–3. Margraff died suddenly of a heart attack on January 2, 2019.

Head coaching record

See also
 List of college football coaches with 200 wins

References

External links
 Johns Hopkins profile

1960 births
2019 deaths
American football quarterbacks
Albany Great Danes football coaches
Columbia Lions football coaches
Johns Hopkins Blue Jays football coaches
Johns Hopkins Blue Jays football players
Penn Quakers football coaches
Rochester Yellowjackets football coaches
High school football coaches in New York (state)
People from Miller Place, New York
Coaches of American football from New York (state)
Players of American football from New York (state)